Aasif Yusuf Karim (born December 15, 1963, in Mombasa) is a former Kenyan cricketer and a former ODI captain. Karim made a reputation for himself as a useful lower-order batsman but predominantly as a left-arm spinner.

International career
Karim also holds the unique distinction of having captained his country in both representative cricket (ODIs) and tennis (Davis Cup) competition.

Cricket
Karim retired from international cricket following the 1999 World Cup in England but was persuaded to return to add experience to Kenya's squad for the 2003 World Cup in South Africa where he helped Kenya become the first non-Test match playing nation reach the semi-finals of the World Cup. During the  Super Sixes match against Australia, Karim gave the Australians a scare with figures of 8.2-6-7-3 and collecting Man-of-the-match honours. He lost in his last ODI, the World Cup Semi Final against India. Karim announced at the end of the tournament that he would be retiring, this time for good.

Tennis
Karim represented Kenya in a Davis Cup tie against Egypt in 1988. He played two singles matches and one doubles rubber.

References

External links
 

1963 births
Living people
Cricketers at the 1996 Cricket World Cup
Cricketers at the 1998 Commonwealth Games
Cricketers at the 1999 Cricket World Cup
Cricketers at the 2003 Cricket World Cup
Commonwealth Games competitors for Kenya
Kenya One Day International cricketers
Kenyan cricket captains
Kenyan cricketers
Kenyan Muslims
Kenyan male tennis players
Kenyan people of Indian descent
Sportspeople from Mombasa